Mikołaj Stanisław Oborski (1576–1646) was a Polish jesuit and writer.

Oborski joined the Jesuit Order in 1602 where he ran several Jesuit colleges in Poland and investigated the miracles of Stanislaus Kostka.

Works
Aquila grandis Martinus Oborski, Palatinus Podlachiae, Warszawa 1603;
Relacja albo krótkie opisanie cudów niektórych błogosławionego Stanisława Kostki, Kraków 1603;
Wypis z procesu kanonizacji św. Stanisława Kostki.

1576 births
1646 deaths
17th-century Polish Jesuits
Jesuit bishops